Stevie Findlay is a Scottish football manager who was first-team coach of Airdrieonians.

Airdrieonians
Following coaching experience of the under-20s at the club, Findlay was appointed First-Team Coach of Scottish League One side Airdrieonians on 29 September 2017.

Managerial Statistics

References

Living people
Airdrieonians F.C. managers
Scottish Professional Football League managers
Scottish football managers
Year of birth missing (living people)
Fauldhouse United F.C. non-playing staff